Unicaja is a Spanish savings bank based in Málaga and chartered as a caja de ahorros providing retail banking services.  The banks full name is Monte de Piedad y Caja de Ahorros de Ronda, Cádiz, Almería, Málaga y Antequera after the names of all the merged entities and the mount of piety structure.

It is similar to what would be called a savings and loan association in the United States, or a building society or trustee savings bank in the UK and Ireland. It operates primarily in the south of Spain.

History
Unicaja was founded 18 March 1991 with the merger of five similar institutions, each of which contributed its location to the corporate name of the merged entity:

 Monte de Piedad y Caja de Ahorros de Ronda (founded 1909)
 Caja de Ahorros y Monte de Piedad de Cádiz (founded 1884)
 Monte de Piedad y Caja de Ahorros de Almería (founded 1900)
 Caja de Ahorros Provincial de Málaga (founded 1949)
 Caja de Ahorros y Préstamos de Antequera (founded 1904)

On 30 December 2020 it was announced Unicaja is buying Liberbank. The new merged company will be the fifth largest of Spain.

Sponsorships
The company sponsors several major sports clubs in its region. It is the owner of the basketball club Baloncesto Málaga, the sponsor of the volleyball club CV Almería, and is also a major sponsor, though not name sponsor, of Málaga CF.

See also
 List of banks in Spain

References

External links
 Unicaja website

Banks of Spain
Companies of Andalusia
Málaga